Eastbourne Borough Council in East Sussex, England, is elected every four years. Until 2007 one third of the council was elected each year, followed by one year without an election. 27 councillors are elected with 3 each from the 9 wards.

Political control
Since the first election to the council in 1973 political control of the council has been held by the following parties:

Leadership
The leaders of the council since 2001 have been:

Council elections
Summary of the council composition after recent council elections, click on the year for full details of each election.

Boundary changes took place for the 2002 election which reduced the number of seats by 3, leading to the whole council being elected in that year. The council then switched from a system of by-third elections to whole council elections in 2007.

1973 Eastbourne Borough Council election
1976 Eastbourne Borough Council election (New ward boundaries)
1979 Eastbourne Borough Council election
1980 Eastbourne Borough Council election
1982 Eastbourne Borough Council election
1983 Eastbourne Borough Council election
1984 Eastbourne Borough Council election
1986 Eastbourne Borough Council election
1987 Eastbourne Borough Council election
1988 Eastbourne Borough Council election
1990 Eastbourne Borough Council election
1991 Eastbourne Borough Council election

Borough result maps

By-election results
By-elections occur when seats become vacant between council elections. Below is a summary of recent by-elections; full by-election results can be found by clicking on the by-election name.

References

External links
Eastbourne Borough Council

 
Council elections in East Sussex
District council elections in England